A hook in ten-pin bowling is a ball that rolls in a curving pattern (as opposed to straight). The purpose of the hook is to give the ball a better angle at the 1-3 pocket (right-handers) or 1-2 pocket (left-handers.) to achieve a strike. When a ball is rolled straight, hitting the pocket must be precise. By hooking the ball, the ball will hit the pins with more force, producing better carry - especially on the 5-pin during a strike ball. Straight roll - even when it hits the pocket, will tend to leave a tap such as the 5-pin on a light hit, or the 10-pin if the ball was just slightly right of center pocket or with inadequate entry angle. A hook ball can achieve strikes with less precise hits.

A hook ball can also help the bowler shape the shot on challenging oil patterns.

In duckpin bowling, candlepin bowling, and nine-pin bowling, hook potential is greatly reduced since the balls are generally rolled much faster and thus have less time for a hook to develop.

Techniques 

There are two ways to produce a hook. The first method involves bowling technique. At the moment of throwing the bowling ball, the hand should be behind the ball and where the thumb (for a right-hander) is anywhere between 10-o'clock and 12-o'clock, and the two fingers are between 4-o'clock and 6-o'clock. Just before releasing the ball, the entire hand starts rotating in a counter-clockwise motion. The thumb must fall out of the ball first. And then, the middle and ring finger release almost simultaneously, again in a counter-clockwise direction. The two fingers releasing while rotating is called "lift," where this type of a release gives the roll more torque and therefore more power. This release technique gives the bowling ball its spin needed for the hook. When the two fingers lift the ball correctly, it will cause the thumb to naturally fall out of the ball first, so one does not have to make a conscious effort to remove the thumb before the fingers.

Of course there are innumerable variations in style and technique and the position of the thumb can vary from person to person. Some bowlers, including professionals, will actually roll the bowling ball with just the two fingers, allowing the hand to give the ball even more torque without having to worry about the thumb restricting the spin.

The second way to produce a hook is by modifying the bowling ball. Illegally, one can play with the weighting of the bowling ball, such as drilling the ball so that there is more side weight on the right side of the ball (for a right-hander,) which would cause the ball to pull from right to left, causing a hook. Bowling balls ship with the weighting specifications on the container. A bowling shop professional can drill a bowling ball by first knowing the type of roll the bowler wants, and then can pick out the bowling ball with the weighting specifications in mind that match the bowler's needs. For a beginning bowler, the professional will usually drill the ball with the label directly in the middle, and between the fingers and thumb holes, causing the weighting to be balanced on both sides, causing the ball to roll straight.

Under USBC regulations, one can drill up to five holes on the bowling ball. Most bowlers use three holes (thumb and two fingers,). On past, one could drill additional holes on other parts of the bowling ball, to take additional weight off of a portion of the bowling ball, such as an axis hole that allows the bowling ball's hook to stabilize during its roll to the pins. Doctoring the bowling ball by adding additional holes was recommended for experienced bowlers enough to know where to place these holes, such as studying the track area of the ball and knowing where to place the axis hole. Starting August 1, 2020, there is elimination of balance holes. With the elimination of balance holes, bowlers may have up to five holes for gripping purposes and all gripping holes must be used on every delivery.

Backup ball 
A backup ball or back-up ball produces the opposite result of a hook. When a ball is rolled by a right-hander, the ball will hook from left to right. The bowling ball can be drilled for a left-handed bowler. The exact same principles of hooking a ball are applied on a backup ball, except the hand rotates clockwise for a right-handed bowler and counterclockwise for a left-handed bowler.

Backup balls are rarely thrown intentionally by serious bowlers, as the hand motion is much more difficult to accomplish than a standard hook. However, certain spares, such as the 2-8-10 for a right-hander, are easier to accomplish with one (as the rules of bowling prevent a bowler from switching hands). Bowlers may also use a backup ball due to lane conditions and a very small number of bowlers throw a backup ball regularly.

See also
Bowling
Bowling ball
Glossary of bowling
Ten-pin bowling
Massé shot, an equivalent technique employed in billiards to impart spin on the cue ball and produce a curving pattern.

Publications

 
  Study began in 2005. Publication date is estimated based on article content.

References

 http://www.wikihow.com/Hook-a-Bowling-Ball
 Aki, Chip. http://en.allexperts.com/q/Bowling-1812/throw-hook-ball.htm
 http://www.thebowlingcoach.com/bowling_hook.html
 http://www.improvebowling.com/hook_ball_technique.html
 http://www.bowling-tips.org/how-to-bowl-a-hook.php
 https://www.bowl.com/News/NewsDetails.aspx?id=23622331019

Ten-pin bowling